Pipalia may refer to one of two villages in Bhopal district, Madhya Pradesh, India:

 Pipalia Chhaparband, Huzur tehsil
 Pipalia Hasnabad, Berasia tehsil